Moment by Moment: The Healing Journey of Molly Hale is a 2005 documentary film by filmmaker, Dorothy Fadiman, which is about Molly Hale, a woman who suffered a spinal cord injury so severe that attending medical professionals had little hope for the rehabilitation of feeling and movement below her shoulders.  The film chronicles Molly's recovery process and the support from her partner and community of friends.

In the Winter of 2002, Molly Hale was chosen to be an Olympic torchbearer by the Olympic Committee.

In May 2010, CultureUnplugged.com showed the film as their main feature for their film festival:  Spirit Enlightened.

Molly was a student in Aikido as was shown in the film.  She was chosen as a presenter and  special trainer for the Self-Defense Instructors' Conference and Special Training of the National Women's Martial Arts Federation in July 2011.

References

External links 
 
  Molly and Jeramy's Website 
 Moment by Moment: The Healing Journey of Molly Hale at vimeo.com
 The Film's Page at Culture Unplugged
 The film's Page on Internet Archive
 
 Hale, Molly, Palo Alto Weekly online edition, February 21, 2003
  on KMVT's On the Move by Able Cable Productions, July 2010
 Hilary Sheperd's Reviews  May 2010
 Molly Hale: “Your Spirit is the True Shield.” June, 10, 2011 National Women’s Martial Arts Federation Website Molly Being Chosen as the 2011 Presenter for the National Women's Martial Arts Federation

2005 films
Films directed by Dorothy Fadiman
Documentary films about health care
Documentary films about people with disability
American documentary films
Documentary films about women
2000s English-language films
2000s American films